Bartolf of Nangis or Bartolfus peregrinus was a French historian who died shortly before 1109.

Writings
His Gesta Francorum Iherusalem expugnatium  is a chronicle of the First Crusade.  It draws heavily on the anonymous Gesta Francorum but includes some original details, such as information on Bohemond's crusade to the Byzantine Empire, not attested in any other chronicles. Bartolf also draws in places on the original, now-lost 1106 version of Fulcher of Chartres's history (i.e. not the version we have today, extended to 1120s), making his chronicle particularly useful to scholars of Fulcher's work.

References

1100s deaths
12th-century French historians
French chroniclers
Year of birth unknown
French male writers
11th-century French historians